Vermectias is a genus of crustaceans belonging to the monotypic family Vermectiadidae.

Species:

Vermectias caudiculata 
Vermectias nelladanae

References

Crustaceans